The Evertsen class or Kortenaer class was a class of coastal defense ships of the Royal Netherlands Navy. The class comprised Evertsen, Piet Hein and Kortenaer.

Design
The main armament of the ships where three  guns in a double and single turret. Secondary armament included two single  guns and six single  guns.

Construction

Notes

External links

Description of class

Coastal defence ships of the Royal Netherlands Navy
19th-century naval ships of the Netherlands